Robert F. Wagner (1877–1953) was a U.S. Senator from New York from 1927 to 1949. Senator Wagner may also refer to:

David Wagner (judge) (1826–1902), Missouri State Senate
Frank Wagner (politician) (born 1955), Virginia State Senate
George D. Wagner (1829–1869), Indiana State Senate
Jack Wagner (politician) (born 1948), Pennsylvania State Senate
Joseph Wagner (New York politician) (1853–1932), New York State Senate
Joseph Wagner (Wisconsin politician) (1809–1896), Wisconsin State Senate
Michael J. Wagner (1941–2014), Maryland State Senate
Richard Van Wagner (1936–2007), New Jersey State Senate
Rob Wagner (politician) (born 1973), Oregon State Senate
Scott Wagner (born 1955), Pennsylvania State Senate
Sue Wagner (born 1940), Nevada State Senate
Thomas M. Wagner (1820s–1862), South Carolina State Senate
Webster Wagner (1817–1882), New York State Senate
William Wagner (philanthropist) (1796–1885), Pennsylvania State Senate

See also
Senator Wagoner (disambiguation)